USS Octans (AF-26) was a stores ship acquired by the U.S. Navy for service in World War II, named after the constellation Octans. She was responsible for delivering necessary goods and equipment to ships and stations in the war zone.

Octans (AF–26) was built as SS Ulua in 1917 by Workman Clark and Co., Ltd., Belfast; acquired by the Navy 8 May 1943 under charter through the War Shipping Administration from her owner, the United Fruit Co.; and commissioned 11 June.

World War II Pacific Theatre operations 

Following two weeks of fitting out at Oakland, California, Octans departed San Francisco Bay on 25 June 1943, bound for Noumea, New Caledonia. Arriving there 17 July, she took up her mission of transporting fresh and frozen provisions from New Zealand and Australian ports to ships and bases located in the Solomons, the Admiralties, and New Guinea.

Transporting wounded soldiers 

During an availability at Sydney, Australia, in November 1944, another capability and task was added with the installation of a 30-bed sick bay. On succeeding trips to Australia from more-advanced bases, wounded soldiers and sailors were transferred from the battle areas to recovery havens.

Shooting down a Japanese plane in the Philippines 

From that time also, Octans began to range farther to the north as she made supply trips to Leyte, Mindoro, and Luzon. While returning from Leyte Gulf on 1 January 1945, she was credited with downing one of a number of Japanese planes which attacked her convoy.

Post-war activity 

With almost two years of supply duty behind her, Octans returned to the U.S. West Coast for a brief overhaul, arriving at Oakland 15 May. Seven weeks later, following a stop in Seattle, Washington, for provisions, she again crossed the Pacific Ocean, arriving at Manila on 13 August. After two more trips to Australia, the stores ship made deliveries to Shanghai, China, and departed 29 December for the United States.

Post-war decommissioning 

Octans sailed to the U.S. East Coast and arrived in Baltimore, Maryland, on 20 February 1946. Decommissioning on 6 March, she was returned to her owner the same day and struck from the Navy List on 20 March.

Military awards and honors 

Octans’ crew members were authorized the following medals:
 China Service Medal (Extended)
 American Campaign Medal
 Asiatic-Pacific Campaign Medal
 World War II Victory Medal
 Philippines Liberation Medal

References

External links 

 NavSource Online: Service Ship Photo Archive - AF-26 Octans

Ships built in Belfast
1917 ships
Stores ships of the United States Navy
World War II auxiliary ships of the United States